Brendan Galdo (born October 5, 1995), better known by his stage name Mr FijiWiji, is an American electronic music producer, known for producing chill-out, future and dubstep songs. Galdo peaked at No. 12 on Billboard's Next Big Sound chart in January 2016.

History
In 2009, up until 2011, Galdo was in contact with, and received help and instruction, from John Danowski, aka "TranceCrafter."

In 2011, Galdo was signed onto the Canadian record label Monstercat for his song, Insomnia and has since had several songs and EPs released by the record label. Galdo has also produced several remixes of Aruna, Myon & Shane 54, Taylr Renee, and Bingo Players. He has also collaborated with Tritonal.

In 2013, Joseph Lyncheski (better known as his stage name Direct) introduced Galdo to future & deep house when they both met each other for the first time. Galdo instantly grew interest in the genres and created two songs Out on a Limb and Let Me Out as a result. Lyncheski and Galdo have since collaborated on multiple songs, notably the deep house song 'Entropy'.

In 2014, Galdo collaborated with duo Tritonal to create the song Seraphic. The duo grew inspiration from chillout and ambient music and wanted to collaborate with Galdo as a result. In the same year, Galdo departed from high school and moved into college, having to deal with the variety of emotions in the process. As a result, he created the EP Growing Up to show that not only is he growing in life as a person, he is also growing up as an artist.

In 2016, Galdo released his fourth EP, entitled 'Dogma'. The EP contains a collaboration with Direct and Aruna, as well as Lucas Marx, son of pop/rock star Richard Marx and Anna Yvette as featured vocalists. In the week of January 23, Galdo peaked at number 12 on Billboard's Next Big Sound chart.

Discography

Albums and EPs

As a featured artist

Singles

Remixes

Awards and nominations

Accolades

References

1997 births
Living people
Future garage musicians
Future house musicians
Dubstep musicians
Deep house musicians
Monstercat artists
Electronic dance music DJs